USS Frances II (SP-503), was a motorboat in United States Navy service from 1917 to 1918.

Frances II was assigned to the 4th Naval District for World War I service, where she served in a non-commissioned status from 1917 to 1918.

References
 
 Department of the Navy Naval History and Heritage Command Online Library of Selected Images: U.S. Navy Ships: "SP" #s and "ID" #s -- World War I Era Patrol Vessels and other Acquired Ships and Craft-numbered from SP-500 through SP-599

Patrol vessels of the United States Navy
World War I patrol vessels of the United States